K. Kuppan is an Indian politician and was a member of the 14th Tamil Nadu Legislative Assembly from the Thiruvottiyur constituency. He represented the All India Anna Dravida Munnetra Kazhagam party.

The elections of 2016 resulted in his constituency being won by K. P. P. Samy.

In September 2016, Kuppan was put forward as an AIADMK candidate for the Chennai Corporation elections.

References 

Tamil Nadu MLAs 2011–2016
All India Anna Dravida Munnetra Kazhagam politicians
Living people
People from Tiruvottiyur
Year of birth missing (living people)
Tamil Nadu MLAs 1991–1996